The Oomoto Shin'yu (大本神諭) is a sacred scripture of Oomoto, a Japanese new religion founded in 1892 by Deguchi Nao.

The original manuscript was called by Nao Ofudesaki or Ofudegaki. Encompassing roughly 200,000 pages of Japanese paper, it is written entirely in uneven hiragana which even Oomoto followers regard as unskilled. It is claimed that Deguchi was illiterate, and that the text is an emanation of a powerful kami named Ushitora no Konjin. The first writing includes warning that Tokyo would become a wilderness and Ayabe would become the capital. When Nao began to produce this document, people thought she was insane. But in 1892 she predicted the First Sino-Japanese War two years before it happened. When the war broke out, people began to take her more seriously.

The modern publication of the Ofudesaki by the Oomoto organization is called Oomoto Shin'yu. There are a number of issues with this publication. Since the original contained prophecies of war with America and attacks on the Emperor, the text was temporarily banned in 1920 and heavily censored when it was finally published, and no version survives without the censor's black marks. It is suspected that a military official had a hand in its editing, against Nao's specific request. Oddly, one of the original verses read, "Not a single word of this writing is inaccurate," which seems to preclude editing.

References

External links
 http://www.oomoto.or.jp/English/enKyos/kaisoden/index.html
 http://www.oomoto.or.jp/English/enDokt/dokt-en.html
 http://www.k3.dion.ne.jp/~reikaimg/ofudesaki.html (excerpt)

Oomoto
Religious texts